Intimidator 305 is a steel roller coaster located at Kings Dominion in Doswell, Virginia, United States. Manufactured by Intamin, Intimidator 305 opened to the public on April 2, 2010, as the park's fourteenth roller coaster. It is located in the Jungle X-Pedition section of the park near Anaconda on the former site of the Safari Monorail ride. The $25-million investment was the largest of any ride in park history. Themed to racing, the coaster is named after the late NASCAR driver Dale Earnhardt, who was commonly known as "The Intimidator".

Its unique lift hill structure only utilizes two main points of support at the hill's crest. Its overall height is also higher than the observation platform of the park's tallest structure, the Eiffel Tower attraction. After Intimidator 305's first operating season, the ride's first turn underwent major reconstruction to reduce the number of greyouts and blackouts some riders were experiencing.

History
	
Kings Dominion announced plans on August 20, 2009, to build a new roller coaster called Intimidator 305 for the 2010 season. The new ride would be a Giga Coaster model from Swiss manufacturer Intamin exceeding  in height. Its name would reference the late NASCAR racing legend Dale Earnhardt, who had been nicknamed the "Intimidator". Dale Earnhardt Incorporated CEO Jeff Steiner, Dale Earnhardt's daughter Taylor Earnhardt, and then Cedar Fair CEO Dick Kinzel were all in attendance of the press event, which was led by Kings Dominion's Director of Marketing Ed Kuhlmann. Animation videos of the ride as well as a working scale model were on display. The ride would be the 15th operating roller coaster at Kings Dominion.

The new coaster was built on the former land occupied by the Safari Monorail, which closed in 1993. Kings Dominion broke ground on June 1, 2009, with the first track pieces arriving several days later. On August 19, 2009, the first pieces of steel were put into place. The  lift hill was topped off a few months later in November. Construction continued through the winter and completed on January 9, 2010. First test runs began on March 14, 2010, and Kings Dominion announced that the ride was complete two weeks later. Intimidator 305 had cost $25 million to construct.

Intimidator 305 was considered by amusement-park enthusiasts to be one of the most anticipated new roller coasters of 2010. A media preview event was held on April 1, 2010, and the ride opened the following day, when Kings Dominion opened for the season. The plaza near the ride's entrance featured Dale Earnhardt's black Monte Carlo on display, as well as commemorative plaques celebrating the famed driver's career. Intimidator 305 was one of two roller coasters themed to Earnhardt that opened in 2010; the other was Intimidator, a hypercoaster manufactured by Bolliger & Mabillard at Carowinds, another Cedar Fair park. Kings Dominion officials hoped that the ride would attract guests, and the park recorded increased attendance during the 2010 season as a result.

Modifications
Some riders experienced problems on that turn because of extremely high positive G-forces produced by the ride's original design. Riders reported symptoms of greying or blacking out, a brief loss of vision or consciousness depending on severity. To lower the number of occurrences, Kings Dominion reduced the coaster's maximum speed by temporarily installing trim brakes on the first drop. During the following off-season, the coaster's first turn was redesigned, resulting in a wider turn radius and fewer G-forces.

Ride experience

Intimidator 305 has been described as a mix of Millennium Force and Maverick, both located at Cedar Point. Intamin designed the ride to feature the high lift hill like Millennium Force. Following the lift hill are low-to-the-ground tight turns and hills, similar to Maverick. The ride's capacity is 1,350 riders per hour, although Intamin gives a higher theoretical capacity of 1,500 riders per hour.

Layout
While the train is being loaded in the station, the catch car of the cable lift is latched onto the middle car of the train. Before the train leaves the station, a recording that states, "Gentlemen, start your engines!" is heard followed by a loud revving sound. The drop is steep enough and sudden enough that riders towards the back of the train are thrown out of their seats into the restraints. The train turns right into a 270-degree turn before ascending the  airtime hill. The train then descends into a high-speed bunny hop before entering another high-speed turn. The train then maneuvers 3 sharp twists before entering the final high-speed turn. The train then climbs another airtime hill with brakes, followed by another airtime hill before entering a final twist and then climbing a small, twisty bunny hop into the magnetic brakes. One cycle of the ride lasts about 3 minutes.

Trains and theme
Intimidator 305 features two trains themed as Dale Earnhardt's black number 3 car. The trains feature headlights at the front of each train as well as advertisement stickers that are found on NASCAR cars. One train is red with the other being silver. Each train has eight four-passenger cars, allowing thirty-two passengers per train. The trains are arranged in stadium-style seating with overhead lap bars fitted with soft, padded over-the-shoulder straps. In early July 2010, the ride received a unique new restraint design. The over-the-shoulder part of the harness now resembles a padded seat belt rather than the typical over-the-shoulder restraints used by Intamin.

Reception
When the ride opened, a writer for The Washington Post said: "Shot out of a cannon is as good a way as any to describe how it feels getting to the pinnacle. But the intimidation begins long before you are tightly harnessed into the train." A reporter for the Richmond Times-Dispatch wrote: "Mercifully, the ascent is swift and without pause at the peak, so there's no time to process what's happening."

Awards 
Intimidator 305 was ranked in the Amusement Today's Golden Ticket Awards as the second-best new ride of 2010, with 21% of the vote.

Incidents
On July 9, 2013, before the park opened for the day, one of the trains was performing a test run when it became stuck near the top of the lift hill. The train was brought down a week later, and the ride remained closed for more than two months. Kings Dominion later explained the closure through a statement released on their official Facebook page on August 28, 2013, which stated that a problem with the weight distribution on the gearbox caused a part to warp and fail. The replacement part had to be custom-built in another country, causing the extended closure. The ride reopened on September 14, 2013.

References

External links

 Official page

 Intimidator 305

Roller coasters operated by Cedar Fair
Intimidator
Roller coasters in Virginia
Roller coasters introduced in 2010
2010 establishments in Virginia